The Swedish Army is the land force of the Swedish Armed Forces.

History 

Svea Life Guards dates back to the year 1521, when the men of Dalarna chose 16 young able men as body guards for the insurgent nobleman Gustav Vasa in the Swedish War of Liberation against the Danish-dominated Union of Kalmar, thus making the present-day Life Guards one of the world's oldest regiments still on active duty.

In 1901, Sweden introduced conscription. The conscription system was abolished in 2010 but reinstated in 2017.

Organisation
The peace-time organisation of the Swedish Army is divided into a number of regiments for the different branches. The number of active regiments has been reduced since the end of the Cold War. However the Swedish Army has begun to expand once again. The regiment forms training organizations that train the various battalions of the army and home guard.

The Swedish Armed Forces recently underwent a transformation from conscription-based recruitment to a professional defence organisation. This is part of a larger goal to abandon the mass army from the Cold War and develop an army better suited to modern maneuver warfare and at the same time retain a higher readiness. Since 2014, the Swedish army has had around 50,000 soldiers in either full-time or part-time duty, with eight mechanized infantry battalions instantly available at any time and the full force of 71 battalions ready to be deployed within one week. The regular army consists of 8 mechanised maneuver battalions, 19 support battalions of different kinds including artillery battalions, anti-aircraft battalions, combat engineer battalions, rangers, logistics battalions and 4 reserve heavy armoured battalions and 40 territorial defence battalions. The battalion is the core unit but all units are completely modular and can be arranged in combat teams from company to brigade level with different units depending on the task. There are a total of 6 permanent staffs under the central command capable of handling large battlegroups, 4 regional staffs and 2 brigade staffs.

Leadership

Until 1937 the King was the formal Head of the Army, and until 1974 of the Armed Forces at large. In 1937, the Chief of the Army position and headquarters staff (CA) was created to lead the Army in peacetime. Following a larger reorganisation of the Swedish Armed Forces in 1994, CA ceased to exist as an independent agency, and all of the Armed Forces was centralized under the Supreme Commander (ÖB). Instead, the post Chief of Army Staff was created at the then newly instituted Swedish Armed Forces Headquarters (HKV).

In 1998, the Swedish Armed Forces was yet again reorganized. Most of the duties of the Chief of Army Staff were transferred to the newly instituted post of "Inspector General of the Army". The post is similar to that of the "Inspector General of the Swedish Navy" and the "Inspector General of the Swedish Air Force", later renamed to "Inspector of the Army". In 2014, the Chief of Army (AC) position was reinstated.

Active regiments 

Swedish Army regiments are tasked with training conscripts for the operational battalions of the army's rapid reaction organisation. The Gotland Regiment is the only regiment that also trains Home Guard troops. The currently active regiments and their main peacetime subordinate units are:

 Life Guards (LG), in Stockholm
 Stockholm Command Staff
 Armed Forces International Centre (Swedint)
 Armed Forces Dog Service Unit (FHTE)
 Armed Forces Military Music Center (FöMus)
Life Guards Battalion
11. Military Police Battalion
13. Security Battalion
12. Mechanized Infantry Battalion
Livgardesgruppen
 Dalarna Regiment (I 13), in Falun
 2x Infantry battalions, in Falun
 Norrbotten Regiment (I 19), in Boden
 Norrbotten Armoured Battalion (Pbat / I 19) trains the troops of the 191st and 192nd mechanized battalions, and 3rd brigade reconnaissance company
 Armed Forces Winter Unit (FMVE), in Boden and Arvidsjaur
 Västernorrland Regiment (I 21), in Sollefteå
 2x Infantry battalions, in Sollefteå
 Jämtland Ranger Corps (JFK), in Östersund
 Life Regiment Hussars (K 3), in Karlsborg
 Training companies, train the troops of the 31st Ranger Battalion and 32nd Intelligence Battalion
 Armed Forces Survival School
 Norrland Dragoon Regiment (K 4), in Arvidsjaur
 Training companies, trains the troops of the 193rd Ranger Battalion
 Skaraborg Regiment (P 4), in Skövde
 Training unit (KFE), trains the troops of the 41st and 42nd mechanized battalions, 1st heavy transport company, and 2nd brigade reconnaissance company
 South Scanian Regiment (P 7), in Revingehed
 Training unit (KFE), trains the troops of the 71st and 72nd Light Mechanised Battalion
 Gotland Regiment (P 18), in Visby
 Gotlandsgruppen (GLG), trains and supports the Home Guard on Gotland
 Gotland Battalion (32. hvbat), in Visby
 Boden Artillery Regiment (A 8) in Boden
 Artillery Battalion, trains the troops of the 91st and 92nd artillery battalions
 Artillery Combat School
 Air Defence Regiment (Lv 6), in Halmstad
 Air Defence Battalion, trains the troops of the 61st and 62nd air defence battalions
 Göta Engineer Regiment (Ing 2), in Eksjö
 Engineer Battalion, trains the troops of the 21st and 22nd engineer battalions
 Field Works School
 Göta Logistic Regiment (T 2), in Skövde
Training unit, training the troops of the 1st and 2nd logistic battalions

Operational formations in 2022
The Swedish Army distinguishes an administrative from an operational structure. The administrative structure includes the peacetime depot units (depåförband), which are responsible for the training, equipment and combat readiness of the forces. Depot units are the army regiments, the air force flotillas, the naval flotillas or the armed forces centers. The depot units generate wartime units (krigsförband), which are transferred to their respective wartime formations, so normally the Swedish army regiments are composed of administrative and training companies during peacetime and their battalions are only formed for exercises and during wartime. The operational units in their entirety are known as the operational organisation of the armed forces (Försvarsmaktens Insatsorganisation (FM IO or just IO, followed by the year it has been introduced in, as IO 2018 or just IO 18 for example) in Swedish). The operational organisation of the army plans for the training regiments to form two combat brigades (2nd and 3rd) and a number of independent combat battalions within a few days. This plan, however, was considered by the Supreme Commander to be impossible due to the economic situation at the time.

In 2013, the Armed Forces issued a statement saying that the reorganisation would only suffice for a reasonable defence of Swedish territory for one week. The force was to include the following units:

As of 2022 the Army's units of the Operational Organisation are:

 Life Guards (LG), in Kungsängen
 Life Guards Battalion (Livbataljonen)
 Staff and support company, life guards company, life guards mounted squadron, cavalry mounted squadron
 11th Military Police Battalion (11. militärpolisbataljonen)
 Personnel protection company, two military police companies, investigation group
 12th Motorized Rifle Battalion (12. motoriserade skyttebataljonen)
 Staff and support company, three Patria AMV mechanized companies, support company
 13th Security Battalion (13. säkerhetsbataljonen)
 Staff and operations squadron, land security squadron, sea security company
 Life Regiment Hussars (K 3), in Karlsborg
 31st Ranger Battalion
 Staff and support squadron, three Jägar squadrons, logistic squadron
 32nd Intelligence Battalion
 Functions squadron, two reconnaissance squadrons, parachute Jägar company
 Norrland Dragoon Regiment (K 4), in Arvidsjaur
 Norrland Jägar Battalion (Norrlandsjägarbataljon)
 Skaraborg Regiment (P 4), in Skövde
 2nd Brigade Staff (2. brigadstaben)
 41st Armored Battalion (41. pansarbataljonen)
 Staff and support company, two Stridsvagn 122 tank companies, two CV90 mechanized companies, logistic company
 42nd Armored Battalion (42. pansarbataljonen)
 Staff and support company, two Stridsvagn 122 tank companies, two CV90 mechanized companies, logistic company
 1st Heavy Transport Company (1. tungtransportkompaniet)
 South Scanian Regiment (P 7), in Revingehed 
 71st Motorized Rifle Battalion (71. motoriserade skyttebataljonen)
 Staff and support company, three Patria AMV mechanized companies, logistic company
 72nd Armored Battalion (72. pansarbataljonen)
 Staff and support company, two Stridsvagn 122 tank companies, two CV90 mechanized companies, logistic company
 Dalarna Regiment (I 13), in Falun
 131st Rifle Battalion (131. skyttebataljonen - being raised)
 132nd Rifle Battalion (132. skyttebataljonen - being raised)
 Gotland Regiment (P 18), in Visby
 181st Armored Battalion (181. pansarbataljonen)
 Staff and support company, Stridsvagn 122 tank company, CV90 mechanized company, logistic company
 Norrbotten Regiment (I 19), in Boden
 3rd Brigade Staff (3. brigadstaben)
 191st Armored Battalion (191. pansarbataljonen)
 Staff and support company, two Stridsvagn 122 tank companies, two CV90 mechanized companies, logistic company
 192nd Armored Battalion (192. pansarbataljonen)
 Staff and support company, two Stridsvagn 122 tank companies, two CV90 mechanized companies, logistic company
 3rd Brigade Reconnaissance Company (3. brigadspaningskompaniet), equipped with CV90
 Västernorrland Regiment (I 21), in Sollefteå
 211th Rifle Battalion (211. skyttebataljonen - being raised)
 Jämtland Field Jägar Corps (Jämtlands fältjägarkår), in Östersund
 212th Rifle Battalion (212. skyttebataljonen - being raised)
 Boden Artillery Regiment (A 8), in Boden
 81st Artillery Battalion (81. artilleribataljon)
 Staff and logistic battery, three Archer batteries, sensor battery
 82nd Artillery Battalion (82. artilleribataljon)
 Staff and logistic battery, three Archer batteries, sensor battery
 Bergslagen Artillery Regiment (A 9), in Kristinehamn
 91st Artillery Battalion (91. artilleribataljonen - being raised)
 Staff and logistic battery, three Archer batteries, sensor battery
 92nd Artillery Battalion (92. artilleribataljonen - being raised)
 Staff and logistic battery, three Archer batteries, sensor battery
 Göta Engineer Regiment (Ing 2), in Eksjö
 21st Engineer Battalion (21. ingenjörbataljon)
 Staff and logistic company, two engineer companies, machine/bridging company
 22nd Engineer Battalion (22. ingenjörbataljon)
 Staff and logistic company, two engineer companies, machine/bridging company
 Air Defence Regiment (Lv 6), in Halmstad
 61st Air Defence Battalion (61. luftvärnsbataljonen)
 62nd Air Defence Battalion (62. luftvärnsbataljonen)
 Göta Logistic Regiment (T 2), in Skövde
 1st Logistic Battalion (1. logistikbataljonen)
 2nd Logistic Battalion (2. logistikbataljonen)
 1st Medical Reinforcement Company (1. sjukvårdsförstärkningskompaniet)
 2nd Medical Reinforcement Company (2. sjukvårdsförstärkningskompaniet)
 1st Traffic and Movement Control Company (1. trafik- och transportledningskompaniet)

The following Armed Forces' establishments provide additional units for the Rapid Reaction Organisation:

 Command Regiment (LedR), in Enköping
 Command Battalion (Ledningsplatsbataljonen)
 Three Staff companies, public affairs/ interpreter/ combat camera company
 Signal Battalion (Sambandsbataljonen)
 Staff company, two signal companies, signal reinforcement company
 Electronic Warfare Battalion (Telekrigsbataljonen)	
 Psychological Operations (Psykologiska operationer)
 Meteorology and Oceanography Center (Meteorologi- och oceanograficentrum)
 Armed Forces Centre for Defence Medicine, in Gothenburg
 1st Hospital Company (1. sjukhuskompaniet)
 2nd Hospital Company (2. sjukhuskompaniet)
 National CBRN Defence Centre (SkyddC), in Umeå
 1st CBRN defense Company (1. CBRN-kompaniet)
 Armed Forces Technical School, in Halmstad
 1st Operational Logistics Battalion (1. Operativa logistikbataljon)

Equipment

Home Guard 
The Home Guard (Hemvärnet) consists of 40 battalions with a total of 22,000 men. Many of the soldiers have served abroad with regular army units.

Northern Military Region 

The Northern Military Region is responsible for supporting Home Guard units in, Jämtland County, Norrbotten County, Västerbotten County, and Västernorrland County with training and administrative resources.

 Northern Military Region, in Boden
 Lappland Jäger Group (Lapplandsjägargruppen – LJG), in Kiruna (Northern Norrbotten County)
 Lappland Jäger Battalion (Lapplandsjägarbataljonen – 10. hvbat), in Kiruna
 Frontier Jäger Battalion (Gränsjägarbataljonen – 11. hvbat), in Kalix
 Norrbotten Group (Norrbottensgruppen – NBG), in Boden (Southern Norrbotten County)
 Norrbotten Battalion (Norrbottensbataljonen – 12. hvbat), in Luleå
 Västerbotten Group (Västerbottensgruppen – VBG), in Umeå (Västerbotten County)
 Västerbotten Battalion (Västerbottensbataljonen – 13. hvbat), in Umeå
 Field Jäger Group (Fältjägargruppen – FJG), in Östersund (Jämtland County)
 Field Jäger Battalion (Fältjägarbataljonen – 14. hvbat), in Östersund
 Västernorrland Group (Västernorrlandsgruppen – VNG), in Härnösand (Västernorrland County)
 Ångermanland Battalion (Ångermanlandsbataljonen – 15. hvbat, Ångermanland province), in Örnsköldsvik
 Medelpad Battalion (Medelpadsbataljonen – 16. hvbat, Medelpad province), in Sundsvall

Central Military Region 

The Central Military Region is responsible for supporting Home Guard units in Dalarna County, Gävleborg County, Södermanland County, Stockholm County, Uppsala County, and Västmanland County with training and administrative resources.

 Central Military Region, in Kungsängen
 Dal Regiment Group (Dalregementsgruppen – DRG), in Falun (Dalarna County)
 Dala Battalion (Dalabataljonen – 17. hvbat), in Falun
 Gävleborg Group (Gävleborgsgruppen – GBG), in Gävle (Gävleborg County)
 Gävleborg Battalion (Gävleborgsbataljonen – 18. hvbat), in Gävle
 Uppland and Västmanland Group (Upplands- och Västmanlandsgruppen – UVG), in Enköping (Uppsala and Västmanland counties)
 Uppland Battalion (Upplandsbataljonen – 21. hvbat), in Uppsala
 Västmanland Battalion (Västmanlandsbataljonen – 22. hvbat), in Västerås
 Life Guards Group (Livgardesgruppen – LGG), in Kungsängen (Stockholm County)
 Attundaland Battalion (Attundalandsbataljonen – 23. hvbat), in Stockholm
 Stockholm Battalion (Stockholmsbataljonen – 24. hvbat), in Stockholm
 Telgehus Battalion (Telgehusbataljonen – 25. hvbat), in Södertälje
 Ulvsunda Battalion (Ulvsundabataljonen – 26. hvbat), in Stockholm
 Södermanland Group (Södermanlandsgruppen – SLG), in Strängnäs (Södermanland County)
 Södermanland Battalion (Södermanlandsbataljonen – 27. hvbat), in Strängnäs
 Södertörn Group (Södertörnsgruppen – UGS), at Berga Naval Base (Coastal areas of Stockholm County)
 Roslagen Battalion (Roslagsbataljonen – 28. hvbat), in Norrtälje in Roslagen
 Södertörn Battalion (Södertörnsbataljonen – 29. hvbat), at Berga Naval Base in Södertörn

Southern Military Region 

The Southern Military Region is responsible for supporting Home Guard units in Blekinge County, Jönköping County, Kalmar County, Kronoberg County, Skåne County, and Östergötland County with training and administrative resources.

 Southern Military Region, in Revingeby
 Life Grenadier Group (Livgrenadjärgruppen – LGAG), in Linköping (Östergötland County)
 1st Life Grenadier Battalion (Första livgrenadjärbataljonen – 30. hvbat), in Linköping
 2nd Life Grenadier Battalion (Andra livgrenadjärbataljonen – 31. hvbat), in Norrköping
 North Småland Group (Norra Smålandsgruppen – NSG), in Eksjö (Jönköping County)
 North Småland Battalion (Norra Smålandsbataljonen – 33. hvbat), in Jönköping
 Kalmar and Kronoberg Group (Kalmar- och Kronobergsgruppen – KRAG), in Växjö (Kalmar and Kronoberg counties)
 Kalmar Battalion (Kalmarbataljonen – 34. hvbat), in Kalmar
 Kronoberg Battalion (Kronobergsbataljonen – 35. hvbat), in Växjö
 Blekinge Group (Blekingegruppen – BLG), in Karlskrona (Blekinge County)
 Blekinge Western Battalion (Blekinge västra bataljon – 36. hvbat), in Ronneby
 Blekinge Eastern Battalion (Blekinge östra bataljon – 37. hvbat), in Karlskrona
 Scanian Group (Skånska gruppen – SSK), in Revingeby (Skåne County)
 South Scanian Battalion (Södra skånska bataljonen – 46. hvbat), in Lund
 Malmöhus Battalion (Malmöhusbataljonen – 47. hvbat), in Malmö (Malmöhus County)
 Scanian Dragoon Battalion (Skånska dragonbataljonen – 48. hvbat), in Helsingborg
 North Scanian Battalion (Norra skånska bataljonen – 49. hvbat), in Kristianstad

Western Military Region 

The Western Military Region is responsible for supporting Home Guard units in Halland County, Värmland County, Västra Götaland County, and Örebro County with training and administrative resources.

 Western Military Region, in Skövde
 Örebro and Värmland Group (Örebro- och Värmlandsgruppen – ÖVG), in Örebro (Örebro and Värmland counties)
 Värmland Battalion (Värmlandsbataljonen – 19. hvbat), in Karlstad
 Sannahed Battalion (Sannahedsbataljonen – 20. hvbat), in Örebro
 Skaraborg Group (Skaraborgsgruppen – SKG), in Skövde (Västra Götaland County)
 Kinne Battalion (Kinnebataljonen – 38. hvbat), in Lidköping
 Kåkind Battalion (Kåkindbataljonen – 39. hvbat), in Skövde
 Bohusdal Group (Bohusdalgruppen – BDG), in Skredsvik (Bohuslän and Dalsland provinces)
 Bohus Battalion (Bohusbataljonen – 40. hvbat), in Uddevalla
 Elfsborg Group (Elfsborgsgruppen – EBG), in Käringberget (City of Gothenburg)
 Gothenburg Southern Battalion (Göteborgs södra bataljon – 41. hvbat), in Gothenburg
 Gothenburg Northern Battalion (Göteborgs norra bataljon – 42. hvbat), in Gothenburg
 Gothenburg Archipelago Battalion (Göteborgs skärgårds bataljon – 43. hvbat), in Gothenburg
 Älvsborg Battalion (Älvsborgsbataljonen – 44. hvbat), in Borås
 Halland Group (Hallandsgruppen – HAG), in Halmstad (Halland County)
 Halland Battalion (Hallandsbataljonen – 45. hvbat), in Halmstad

Gotland Military Region 
The Home Guard battalion on the island of Gotland falls under the Gotland Regiment, which also commands the active 181st Armored Battalion.

 Militärregion Gotland, in Visby
 Gotland Regiment (P 18), in Visby
 Gotland Group (Gotlandsgruppen – GLG), in Visby
 Gotland Battalion (Gotlandsbataljonen – 32. hvbat), in Visby

Size

The army on active service during most of the 20th century only consisted of conscript receiving their basic training (at the most one year for privates), and conscripts called up for refreshers (at the most one month for privates) with intervals of at least 4–6 years. During WWII smaller or larger parts of the wartime establishment were also called up for periodical stand-by duty (up to 6 months). The figures for total strength below refer to the total force which could be mobilised.
Between the introduction of universal conscription in 1902 until the start of World War II, the army was usually maintained at a consistent strength of 100,000 men, with two-thirds of the force being conscripts for two years. From 1942 onwards, the Swedish government embarked upon a massive and ambitious militarisation program in which conscription was strictly enforced and compulsory service was extended. The basic training for privates was set at 12 months, for future conscript sergeants intended to become platoon leaders (mainly sixth form graduates) 18 months, and for future conscript officers 24 months. These periods were gradually reduced, and the ranks were raised, until it was the same period for all conscripts shortly before conscription was suspended in 2009. This combined with propaganda about conscription being a part of social duty and defending the Swedish principle of folkhemmet, led to an army a size of about 700,000 active duty soldiers that could be mobilised in late 1945. Since the late winter of 1945 the size of the army was slowly decreased as entire reserve battalions and brigades were gradually demobilised, and by late 1947 the size of the army was around 170,000 soldiers who could be mobilised and was planned to stabilise at such a quantity of personnel.

However, due to the rise in tensions between the East and West over the political landscape of Europe, the threat from the Soviet Union in 1949 and 1950, coinciding with the start of the Cold War, led to a return to the militaristic policy by the Swedish government. From 1950 until around 1976 the size of the army was at an average of 250,000 soldiers with a peak of 400,000 mobilisable soldiers during the late 1950s and early 1960s. The rules were badly enforced, but dodging the draft was punishable with imprisonment.

During the 1980s the size of the army was around 180,000 soldiers and was slowly increased as time progressed until around 1988. The end of the Cold War led to a massive restructuring of the Swedish Army. Every year after 1988, the Army discharged around 40,000 conscripts and recruited only 20,000, so that by 1995 the size was down to 80,000 soldiers. Around this time the compulsory service obligation was further reduced to 10 months, reserve service became more flexible, and changes made in enforcement so that forceful enforcement became withdrawn as policy. By 2004 the size of the Swedish Army was down to 60,000 soldiers, and in 2013, three years after the end of conscription, the size was at an all-time low of just 16,000 soldiers, though the army plans to reach a level of 50,000 professional soldiers by 2020, mostly through a large media campaigns. A number of previously disbanded regiments will also be re-raised (Dalarna Regiment, Västernorrland Regiment, Norrland Dragoon Regiment, and Bergslagen Artillery Regiment) with the Jämtland Ranger Regiment re-raised as a battalion of Västernorrland Regiment.

Recruitment
From the 17th century until 1901, Swedish Army recruitment was based upon the allotment system. In 1812, conscription was introduced for all males between age 20 and 25 to serve in the armed forces twelve days a year, increased in 1858 to four weeks per two years. The allotment system was abolished in 1901 and replaced with universal conscription for all males. All personnel were drafted as conscripts for a year of conscription, after which the unit the soldier trained with was put in reserve. Upon completion of conscript service with sufficient service marks, conscripts are eligible to apply for commissioned officer training, NCO/Warrant Officer or from 2007 stay in the Army as a professional private, mainly to be employed in the Nordic Battle Group. The army has employed soldiers for UN service on short time contracts since the 1950s for service abroad.

From July 2010 until 2017, the Swedish Army was an all-professional fighting force. The government announced on 2 March 2017 that conscription was going to be reinstated. Of a pool of around 13,000 men and women born 1999, 4,000 were going to be selected for conscription starting January 2018. The government stated that the number of conscripts may increase in response to foreign events.

Ranks

Commissioned officer ranks
The rank insignia of commissioned officers.

Other ranks
The rank insignia of non-commissioned officers and enlisted personnel.

See also 
Military ranks of the Swedish Armed Forces
Royal Swedish Academy of War Sciences
Swedish Army Museum
List of wars involving Sweden
List of Swedish field marshals
Military district (Sweden)
List of Swedish military commanders
List of Swedish regiments
List of military aircraft of Sweden
Allotment system
List of equipment of the Swedish Army
Swedish Military Uniform
United Nations Interim Force in Lebanon

References

External links 

Swedish Army – official website 
Soldf.com – unofficial weapons, vehicles and equipment page of the Swedish Armed forces
Nordic military vehicles site
Scandinavian Armour by Roy Haaland
Svante Wendel's Unofficial Swedish Army Page

 
Army